Federico Gabriel Vera (born 24 March 1998) is an Argentine professional footballer who plays as a right-back for Unión Santa Fe.

Career
Vera left Banco Provincial to join Unión Santa Fe at the age of twelve, having been scouted at the Tiburón Lagunero tournament. In July 2019, having been an unused substitute in April against San Martín in the Copa de la Superliga, Vera was loaned to Torneo Federal A's Sportivo Las Parejas. He made his senior debut at home to Sportivo Belgrano on 31 August, which preceded his first goal arriving against Central Norte on 22 September.  After thirteen appearances, Vera returned to Unión and subsequently made his bow in the Copa Sudamericana versus Emelec; starting both legs.

Career statistics
.

Notes

References

External links

1998 births
Living people
Footballers from Santa Fe, Argentina
Argentine footballers
Association football defenders
Torneo Federal A players
Unión de Santa Fe footballers
Sportivo Las Parejas footballers